Ernst Andres (19 September 1921 – 11 February  1945) was a highly decorated Hauptmann in the Luftwaffe during World War II, and a recipient of the Knight's Cross of the Iron Cross. The Knight's Cross of the Iron Cross was awarded to recognise extreme battlefield bravery or successful military leadership.

During the night of 4 May 1943 to 5 May Angriffsführer England ordered a consolidated attack on Norwich. Involved were 43 aircraft from Kampfgeschwader 2 (KG 2) under the command of KG 2's Geschwaderkommodore Walter Bradel, which took off from the airport of Soesterberg. The attack force was augmented by aircraft from II./Kampfgeschwader 40 and 36 Ju 88 from Kampfgeschwader 6. Bradel, who flying as an observer on a Do 217K piloted by Andres, was attacked by a British nightfighter, and suffered engine damage. Andres attempted an emergency landing near Landsmeer, Amsterdam. The aircraft was 80% damaged and Bradel and the aerial gunner Flieger Werner Becker were killed.

Awards and decorations
 Flugzeugführerabzeichen
 Front Flying Clasp of the Luftwaffe in Gold
 Iron Cross (1939)
 2nd Class 
 1st Class 
 Wound Badge (1939)
 in Black 
 German Cross in Gold on 3 December 1942 as Leutnant in the II./Kampfgeschwader 2
 Knight's Cross of the Iron Cross on 20 April 1944 as Hauptmann and pilot in the Stabsstaffel/Kampfgeschwader 2

References

Citations

Bibliography

 
 
 
 
 de Zeng, H.L; Stanket, D.G; Creek, E.J. (2007). Bomber Units of the Luftwaffe 1933-1945; A Reference Source, Volume 1. Ian Allan Publishing. .

External links
TracesOfWar.com
Ritterkreuztraeger 1939-1945

1921 births
1945 deaths
Luftwaffe pilots
Recipients of the Gold German Cross
Recipients of the Knight's Cross of the Iron Cross
Luftwaffe personnel killed in World War II
Aviators killed by being shot down
German World War II pilots
People from Reutlingen (district)
Military personnel from Baden-Württemberg